Melrose is a village in Curry County, New Mexico, United States. Its population was 651 at the 2010 census. The town is losing population due to rural exodus. Melrose is served by Melrose Elementary School and Melrose High School.

William Hanna (1910–2001), co-founder of Hanna Barbera Studios, was born in Melrose.

Geography
Melrose is located at  (34.427944, -103.628111).

History
During the New Deal, a series of federal programs was initiated during the Great Depression, and the Melrose Art Center was established. The facility was considered to be located in the smallest town to have such a federal art center. Estella García was one of the teachers at the Center.

Demographics

As of the census of 2000,  736 people, 309 households, and 200 families were residing in the village. The population density was 427.2 people per mi2 (165.2/km2). The 375 housing units  averaged 217.7 per mi2 (84.2/km2). The racial makeup of the village was 92.12% White, 0.27% African American, 1.49% Native American, 0.68% Asian, 3.53% from other races, and 1.90% from two or more races. Hispanics or Latinos of any race were 11.55% of the population.

Of the 309 households,  28.5% had children under the age of 18 living with them, 54.0% were married couples living together, 9.7% had a female householder with no husband present, and 35.0% were not families. About 33.0% of all households were made up of individuals, and 17.8% had someone living alone who was 65 years of age or older. The average household size was 2.34, and the average family size was 2.99.

In the village, the age distribution was 25.8% under 18, 6.8% from 18 to 24, 22.4% from 25 to 44, 24.7% from 45 to 64, and 20.2% who were 65 or older. The median age was 42 years. For every 100 females, there were 88.2 males. For every 100 females age 18 and over, there were 82.6 males.

The median income for a household in the village was $26,607, and for a family was $31,635. Males had a median income of $24,643 versus $15,667 for females. The per capita income for the village was $13,053. About 16.4% of families and 21.6% of the population were below the poverty line, including 30.4% of those under age 18 and 15.3% of those age 65 or over.

References

External links
 Melrose entry on City-data.com
 Curry County
 Clovis/Curry County Chamber of Commerce

Villages in Curry County, New Mexico
Villages in New Mexico